Secret of the Three Kingdoms is a 2018 Chinese television series based on the novel San Guo Ji Mi (三国机密; Secret of the Three Kingdoms) by Ma Boyong. Produced by Tangren Media and directed by Patrick Yau and Cheng Wai-man, the series starred Ma Tianyu, Elvis Han, Wan Qian, Dong Jie, Sunny Wang, Dong Xuan, Tan Jianci and Tse Kwan-ho in the leading roles. The series aired on Tencent starting March 27, 2018.

Synopsis
The series is set in the late Eastern Han dynasty of China. Consort Wang, a concubine of Emperor Ling, has just given birth to a pair of twin boys – Liu Xie and Liu Ping – when she is poisoned to death by the jealous Empress He. While Liu Xie is raised by his grandmother Empress Dowager Dong and later becomes the emperor (as Emperor Xian), Liu Ping is secretly taken out of the palace and raised as a commoner.

Eighteen years later, chaos has broken out throughout China as various warlords fight for power and control over territories. Emperor Xian has been reduced to the status of a puppet under the control of a powerful warlord, Cao Cao. During this time, he learns that he has a secret twin brother, Liu Ping, so he summons his brother to the palace to help him save the Eastern Han dynasty from collapse. Throughout these years, Liu Ping has grown up with Sima Yi and never knew about his true origins.

A power struggle breaks out between Liu Ping and Cao Cao. With assistance from Sima Yi, Empress Fu Shou and other Han loyalists, Liu Ping evades several attempts by Cao Cao and his followers to get rid of him. At a critical moment, Liu Ping realises that he cannot do anything to save the Eastern Han dynasty and that the best thing he can do is to back out from the power struggle.

Cast
 Ma Tianyu as Yang Ping / Liu Xie, Emperor Xian of Han
 Elvis Han as Sima Yi
 Wan Qian as Empress Fu Shou
 Dong Jie as Tang Ying, Princess Consort of Hongnong
 Sunny Wang as Guo Jia
 Dong Xuan as Ren Hongchang (Diaochan)
 Tan Jianci as Cao Pi
 Tse Kwan-ho as Cao Cao
 Wang Yuwen as Cao Jie, Empress Xianmu
 Wang Xiaomin as Zhen Fu, Empress Wenzhao
 Li Jianyi as Zhang Yu
 Shu Yaoxuan as Jia Xu
 Wang Renjun as Xun Yu
 Na Renhua as Empress Dowager Dong
 Tu Nan as Man Chong
 Wang Meng as Yang Xiu
 Zhang Qi as Yang Biao
 Shi Wenxiang as Leng Shouguang
 Chang Cheng as Yang Jun
 Li Yansheng as Kong Rong
 Wang Yinuo as Consort Dong
 Sun Zujun as Wang Fu
 Wang Yilin as Zhao Yan
 Liu Yuhan as Cao Zhi
 Jia Benchu as Sima Lang
 Lin Jing as Empress He
 Deng Shang as Xu Fu

Production
The series was filmed at the Hengdian World Studios and Xiangshan Film City between 7 March and 28 June 2017.

Awards and nominations

International broadcast

See also 
List of media adaptations of Romance of the Three Kingdoms

References

2018 Chinese television series debuts
Television series set in the Eastern Han dynasty
Chinese historical television series
Television series by Tangren Media
Television shows based on Chinese novels
Chinese web series
Tencent original programming
2018 Chinese television series endings
2018 web series debuts